The Mohs scale of mineral hardness is a qualitative ordinal scale, from 1 to 10, characterizing scratch resistance of minerals through the ability of harder material to scratch softer material.

The scale was introduced in 1812 by the German geologist and mineralogist Friedrich Mohs, in his book "Versuch einer Elementar-Methode zur naturhistorischen Bestimmung und Erkennung der Fossilien"; it is one of several definitions of hardness in materials science, some of which are more quantitative.

The method of comparing hardness by observing which minerals can scratch others is of great antiquity, having been mentioned by Theophrastus in his treatise On Stones, followed by Pliny the Elder in his Naturalis Historia, . The Mohs scale is useful for identification of minerals in the field, but is not an accurate predictor of how well materials endure in an industrial setting – toughness.

Minerals
The Mohs scale of mineral hardness is based on the ability of one natural sample of mineral to scratch another mineral visibly. The samples of matter used by Mohs are all different minerals. Minerals are chemically pure solids found in nature. Rocks are made up of one or more minerals. As the hardest known naturally occurring substance when the scale was designed, diamonds are at the top of the scale. The hardness of a material is measured against the scale by finding the hardest material that the given material can scratch, or the softest material that can scratch the given material. For example, if some material is scratched by apatite but not by fluorite, its hardness on the Mohs scale would be between 4 and 5.

"Scratching" a material for the purposes of the Mohs scale means creating non-elastic dislocations visible to the naked eye. Frequently, materials that are lower on the Mohs scale can create microscopic, non-elastic dislocations on materials that have a higher Mohs number. While these microscopic dislocations are permanent and sometimes detrimental to the harder material's structural integrity, they are not considered "scratches" for the determination of a Mohs scale number.

Each of the ten hardness values in the Mohs scale is represented by a reference mineral, most of which are widespread in rocks.

The Mohs scale is an ordinal scale. For example, corundum (9) is twice as hard as topaz (8), but diamond (10) is four times as hard as corundum. The table below shows the comparison with the absolute hardness measured by a sclerometer, with pictorial examples.

Using some ordinary materials of known hardness can be a simple way to approximate the position of a mineral on the scale. On the Mohs scale, a streak plate (unglazed porcelain) has a hardness of approximately 7. Other useful comparators are: finger nail (2.5), copper coin (3.5), knife blade (5.5), steel nail (6.5), masonry drill bit (8.5).

Intermediate hardness
The hardness of some minerals is intermediate between two of the Mohs scale reference minerals. Some examples are shown in the table:

Other substances
Some solid substances, which are not minerals, have been assigned a hardness on the Mohs scale. However, if the substance is actually a mixture of other substances, hardness can be difficult to determine or may be misleading or meaningless. For example, some sources have assigned a Mohs hardness of 6 or 7 to granite, but this should be treated with caution because granite is a rock made of several minerals, each with its own Mohs hardness (e.g. topaz-rich granite contains: topaz - hardness 8, quartz - hardness 7, orthoclase feldspar - hardness 6, plagioclase feldspar - hardness 6 to 6.5, mica - hardness 2 to 4).

Use
Despite its lack of precision, the Mohs scale is relevant for field geologists, who use the scale to roughly identify minerals using scratch kits. The Mohs scale hardness of minerals can be commonly found in reference sheets.

Mohs hardness is useful in milling. It allows assessment of which kind of mill will best reduce a given product whose hardness is known. The scale is used at electronic manufacturers for testing the resilience of flat panel display components (such as cover glass for LCDs or encapsulation for OLEDs), as well as to evaluate the hardness of touch screens in consumer electronics.

Comparison with Vickers scale 
Comparison between Mohs hardness and Vickers hardness:

See also

 Brinell scale
 Geological Strength Index
 Hardnesses of the elements (data page)
 Knoop hardness test
 Meyer hardness test
 Pencil hardness
 Rockwell scale
 Rosiwal scale
 Scratch hardness
 Superhard material

References

Further reading
 

Materials science
Mineralogy
Hardness tests
1812 in science
1812 in Germany

de:Härte#Härteprüfung nach Mohs